Ortholfersia is a genus of biting flies in the family of louse flies, Hippoboscidae. There are 4 known species. All species are parasites of macropods.

Distribution 
Found in Australia, some species are very rare, because their hosts are endangered.

Systematics 
Genus Ortholfersia Speiser, 1902
Species group 'a'
Ortholfersia minuta Paramonov, 1954
Species group 'b'
Ortholfersia bequaerti Maa, 1962
Ortholfersia macleayi (Leach, 1817)
Ortholfersia phaneroneura Speiser, 1902

References

Parasitic flies
Hippoboscidae
Parasites of marsupials
Hippoboscoidea genera